The 2001–02 Football League Cup (known as the Worthington Cup for sponsorship reasons) was the 42nd staging of the Football League Cup, a knockout competition for England's top 92 football clubs.

The competition began on 20 August 2001, and ended with the final on 26 February 2002 at the Millennium Stadium in Cardiff as Wembley Stadium had been closed for a rebuild.

The tournament was won by Blackburn Rovers, who beat Tottenham Hotspur 2–1 in the final, thanks to single strikes from Matt Jansen and Andy Cole, sandwiched by an equaliser from Christian Ziege. Blackburn had only just returned to the Premier League at the beginning of the season after relegation several years earlier.

First round
The 70 First, Second and Third Division clubs compete from the First Round, except Manchester City and Coventry. Each section is divided equally into a pot of seeded clubs and a pot of unseeded clubs. Clubs' rankings depend upon their finishing position in the 2000–01 season.

Second round
The 35 winners from the First Round joined the 13 Premier League, clubs not participating in European competition in the Second Round, plus Manchester City and Coventry (who received byes for their league position the previous season). Matches were played on 10–13 September.

Third round
The 25 winners from the Second Round joined the seven Premiership clubs participating in European competition in the Third Round. Matches were played on 8–10 October.

Fourth round
The matches were played on 27–29 November.

Fifth round
The four matches were played on 11–12 and 19 December.

Semi-finals
The semi-final draw was made in December 2001 after the conclusion of the quarter finals. Unlike the other rounds, the semi-final ties were played over two legs, with each team playing one leg at home. The ties were played in the weeks beginning 7 and 21 January 2002.

First leg

Second leg

Blackburn Rovers won 6–3 on aggregate.

Tottenham Hotspur won 6–3 on aggregate

Final

The 2002 Worthington Cup Final was played on 24 February 2002 and was contested between Premier League teams Tottenham Hotspur and Blackburn Rovers at the Millennium Stadium in Cardiff. Blackburn Rovers won the game 2–1.

References

External links
Official Carling Cup website
Carling Cup at bbc.co.uk
League Cup news, match reports and pictures on Reuters.co.uk
Results on Soccerbase

EFL Cup seasons
Cup, 2001-02